The Autonomous Governorate of Estonia of the Russian state was established as a result of the Russian Revolution of 1917 and ceased to exist prior to Estonia becoming a fully independent country in 1918.

History
For most of the time during the rule of Russian Empire 1710–1917, the area of what is now Estonia was divided between two governorates. The Governorate of Estonia in the north corresponded roughly to the area of Danish Estonia, and the northern portion of the Governorate of Livonia, which had a majority of ethnic Estonians.

Free multi-party elections for the Provincial Assembly (Maapäev) were held in May–June 1917. On 5 November 1917, two days before the Bolshevik coup in Petrograd (Saint Petersburg), local Bolsheviks led by Jaan Anvelt and supported by pro-Soviet Russian soldiers and sailors declared themselves the new government in Tallinn (Reval), and attempted to usurp political power in the governorate from governor Jaan Poska on 9 November. On  the Maapäev, refusing to recognize the attempted Bolshevik coup d'état, proclaimed itself to be the only legally elected and constituted authority in Estonia. However, it was soon driven underground by the Bolsheviks.

Even though the plebiscite was to determine the administrative boundaries within Soviet Russia and it was organised by the Bolshevik regime, the subsequent governments of independent Estonia implicitly acknowledged the referendum's result, as the entire town of Narva (including the suburb of Ivangorod) became part of the territory of the newly independent Republic of Estonia from 1918 onward.

In February 1918, after the collapse of the peace talks between Soviet Russia and the German Empire, mainland Estonia was occupied by the German Empire's armed forces. On 24 February 1918, one day before German forces entered Tallinn, the Salvation Committee of the Estonian National Council Maapäev emerged from underground and issued the Estonian Declaration of Independence. After the German capitulation had ended World War I, on 11-14 November 1918, the representatives of Germany in Estonia handed over all power to the government of the newly independent Republic of Estonia.

See also 
 History of Estonia

Notes

References

External links 

On 28 November 1917, the Land council proclaimed itself the highest power in Estonia...
On This Day – 28 November 1917
Though the popularly elected Provisional National Council, had proclaimed itself the highest authority in Estonia as early as 28 November 1917...

Governorate of Estonia
Governorates of the Russian Empire
Baltic governorates
1917 establishments in Estonia
1918 in Estonia
Independence of Estonia